Judith is a feminine given name derived from the Hebrew name יְהוּדִית or Yehudit, meaning "woman of Judea". Judith appeared in the Old Testament as one of Esau's wives, while the deuterocanonical Book of Judith deals with a different Judith. It is in common usage in English, French, German, many Scandinavian languages, Dutch, and Hebrew. In Ethiopia and Eritrea it is called Yodit. 

The name was among the top 50 most popular given names for girls born in the United States between 1936–1956, but its popularity has since declined. It was the 893rd most popular name for baby girls born in the United States in 2012, down from 74th in 1960.

Name variants
Alternative forms of the name Judith include:
يهوديت Yahudit (Arabic)
Giuditta (Italian)
הודעס Hudes (Yiddish)
Iúidit (Irish)
Jitka (Czech) 
Jodi (English)
Jodie (English)
Jody (English)
Judeta (Spanish)
Judina (Spanish)
Ιουδίθ (Iudith) (Greek)
Judit (Catalan), (Hungarian), (Scandinavian), (Spanish)
Judita (Czech), (Slovak), (Spanish), (Lithuanian), (Slovene), (Croatian)
Judite (Portuguese)
Judīte (Latvian)
Judith (French, German)
Juditha (French)
Judithe (French)
Judyta (Polish)
Juta (Polish)
Jutka (Dutch), (Hungarian)
Jutta (German)
Jutte (Dutch), (German)
Juut (Dutch)
Jytte (Danish)
Iudita (Romanian)
יְהוּדִית Yehudit (Hebrew)
יידעל Yidel (Yiddish)
Yodit (Amharic)
יודעל Yudel (Yiddish)
Юдифь Yudif’ (Russian)
Иудифь Iudif’ (Russian)
Джудит Djudit (Russian)
יוטקע Yutke (Yiddish)
Ditka (Slovene)

People
 Queen Judith (disambiguation), a number of medieval women
 Judith of Bavaria (died 843), Frankish queen
 Judith of Friuli (fl. 881), daughter of Eberhard
 Judith of Flanders (c. 843–c. 870), Princess of the Carolingian Franks, Queen of Wessex, Countess of Flanders
 Judith of Schweinfurt (fl. 1003–1058), wife of Bretislaus I of Bohemia
 Gudit (fl. 960), queen who sacked Axum, now in Ethiopia; also known as Judith or Yudit
 Zewditu I (1876–1930), queen of Ethiopia whose name is sometimes erroneously Anglicised as "Judith"
 Judith Anderson, Australian-born British actress
 Judith Arcana, American writer
 Judith Arndt, German cyclist
 Judith Arnold, pen name of Barbara Keeler, American romance novelist 
 Judith Audu, Nigerian actress and blogger
 Judith Auer, German Resistance fighter
 Judith Babirye, Ugandan gospel musician
 Judith Barsi, American actress
 Judith Baxter, British sociolinguist
 Judith Berry (born 1961), Canadian painter
 Judith Binney, New Zealand historian
 Judith Black, American storyteller
 Judith Blau, American sociologist
 Judith Blegen, American operatic soprano
 Judith Ten Bosch, Dutch painter and illustrator
 Judith Burganger (born 1939), American pianist
 Judith Butler, American gender theorist
 Judith Alice Clark, American antiwar activist and convicted murderer 
 Judith Clute (born 1942), Canadian painter, graphic designer, print-maker, and illustrator 
 Judy Collins (born Judith Marjorie Collins), American singer/songwriter
 Dame Judi Dench (born Judith Olivia Dench), English actress and author
 Judith Durham, Australian singer
 Judy Finnigan (born 1939), English television presenter, author, columnist
 Judith Forrai (born 1949), Hungarian historian of science, medical historian, dentist, professor, journal editor-in-chief 
 Judith R. Goodstein (born 1939), American historian of science
 Judith Hamilton, Canadian theatre director
 Judith Hand, American biologist
 Judith Holofernes (born 1976), German singer-songwriter
 Judith Ann Carter Horton (1866–1948), African American educator and librarian
 Judith Ivey, American actress and theatre director
 Judith Jones, American writer and editor
 Judith Keppel, first one-million-pound winner on the television game show Who Wants to Be a Millionaire? in the United Kingdom
 Judith Kerr (1923–2019), German-born British writer and illustrator
 Judith Krantz (1928–2019), American author and journalist
 Judith T. Lessler, American statistician and organic farmer
 Judith Liberman (born 1978), French fairy tale narrator
 Judith Light, American actress
 Judith Lowry, American actress
 Judith Lucy, Australian comedian
 Judith Macgregor, British diplomat
 Judith Maro, Ukrainian-born Welsh-language writer
 Judith Ann Mayotte, American Roman Catholic theologian and humanitarian
 Judith McKenna (born 1966/1967), British businesswoman
 Judith Miller, American journalist and writer
 Judith Miller (antiques expert), British antiques expert
 Judith Neelley (born 1964), American serial killer
 Judith Rakers, German journalist and television presenter
 Judy Sheindlin, judge and host of reality TV show Judge Judy
 Judith E. Stein, American art historian and curator
 Judith Stein (historian), American historian
 Judith Tyberg, American Sanskrit scholar
 Judith Vanistendael (born 1974), Belgian comics author, illustrator
 Judith Zaffirini, American politician
 Judith, heroine of the Book of Judith, one of the books included in the Biblical apocrypha

Fictional characters
 Judith Iscariot, in the film Monty Python's Life of Brian
 Judith Myers (Halloween), eldest sister of Michael Myers in the 1978 movie Halloween
 Judy Hopps, the rabbit protagonist of Disney's 2016 animated film Zootopia
 Judith Mossman (Half Life)
 Judith, in the 2008 video game Tales of Vesperia
 Judith Grimes, in the TV show and comic The Walking Dead
 Judith, the Scourge Diva, a minor character in the popular trading card game Magic: the Gathering
 Judith Dinsmore, a recurring character in the web series The Most Popular Girls in School.

See also
 Judah (disambiguation)
 Judith (disambiguation)
 Judy (given name)

Notes

 
Feminine given names
Hebrew-language names
English feminine given names
French feminine given names
Hebrew feminine given names
German feminine given names
Dutch feminine given names
Norwegian feminine given names
Swedish feminine given names
Danish feminine given names
Icelandic feminine given names

fr:Judith#Sens et origine du nom